José Francisco Walter Ormeño Arango (3 December 1926 – 4 January 2020) was a Peruvian footballer who played as a goalkeeper.

Career
Born in Lima, Ormeño played for Universitario de Deportes, Huracán de Medellín, Mariscal Sucre, Boca Juniors, Rosario Central, Alianza Lima, América and Atlante.

He also played for the Peruvian national team between 1949 and 1957, including playing at the 1949 South American Championship.

After retiring as a player, he managed a number of clubs in Mexico. He died on 4 January 2020, aged 93.

Personal life
Ormeño is the grandfather of Mexican-born Peru international footballer Santiago Ormeño.

References

1926 births
2020 deaths
Peruvian footballers
Peru international footballers
Club Universitario de Deportes footballers
Huracán de Medellín players
Mariscal Sucre players
Boca Juniors footballers
Rosario Central footballers
Club Alianza Lima footballers
Club América footballers
Atlante F.C. footballers
Association football goalkeepers
Peruvian expatriate footballers
Peruvian expatriates in Colombia
Expatriate footballers in Colombia
Peruvian expatriates in Argentina
Expatriate footballers in Argentina
Peruvian expatriates in Mexico
Expatriate footballers in Mexico
C.F. Pachuca managers
Peruvian football managers
Peruvian expatriate football managers
Expatriate football managers in Mexico
Club América managers
C.D. Guadalajara managers
Cruz Azul managers
Club Universidad Nacional managers